Battle Lake may refer to:

Battle Lake, Minnesota
Battle Lake (Alberta)

See also 
 Battle (disambiguation)
 Battle Creek (disambiguation)
 Battle River (disambiguation)
 Naval battle
 Battle